The 2010 New York Yankees season was the 108th season for the New York Yankees franchise. The Yankees were attempting to defend its status as American League and World Series champions, but lost in the ALCS to the Texas Rangers. The Yankees opened and closed the regular season against the Boston Red Sox at Fenway Park. This marked the first time since 1950 this happened. The Yankees and the Los Angeles Dodgers renewed their rivalry as the Bronx Bombers traveled west to face former Yankee icons Joe Torre and Don Mattingly, both of them current and future Dodgers managers.

The Yankees' regular season record for 2010 was 95 wins, 67 losses, 2nd place in the AL East behind Tampa Bay and good for the AL Wild Card.

Offseason
Following the Yankees' 2009 World Series championship, Johnny Damon and Hideki Matsui departed as free agents.
On December 8, the New York Yankees acquired center fielder Curtis Granderson from the Detroit Tigers, trading pitcher Ian Kennedy to the Arizona Diamondbacks and pitcher Phil Coke and minor league outfielder Austin Jackson to Detroit.
On December 9, pitcher Andy Pettitte signed a $11.75 million contract for one year.
On December 22, the Yankees traded outfielder Melky Cabrera, pitcher Michael Dunn, and minor league pitcher Arodys Vizcaíno to the Atlanta Braves for pitchers Javier Vázquez and Boone Logan.
On December 23, designated hitter and first baseman Nick Johnson signed a $5.5 million contract to return to New York for one year, 6 years after being traded from the Yankees to the then Montreal Expos, now the Washington Nationals.
On January 27, outfielder Randy Winn signed with the Yankees on a one-year contract worth $2 million.
On February 16, the Yankees announced that pitcher Dustin Moseley signed a minor league contract with an invitation to spring training.
On February 28, pitcher Chan Ho Park signed a $1.2 million, one-year deal with an additional $300,000 in incentives. To make room for Park on the 40-man roster, pitcher Edwar Ramírez was designated for assignment.

Midseason acquisitions
On July 30, the Yankees acquired Austin Kearns from the Cleveland Indians for a player to be named later. On August 20, the player was revealed to be Zach McAllister.
On July 31, the Yankees traded minor leaguers Mark Melancon and Jimmy Paredes to the Houston Astros for first baseman Lance Berkman.
On July 31, the Yankees acquired Kerry Wood from the Cleveland Indians for a player to be named later or cash considerations.

Roster

Regular season

Season standings

Record vs. opponents

Season highlights

April
With the series win in Oakland clinched, the club matched the 1926 Yankees' all-time franchise record by winning each of the first five series of the season. Only one other club in team history started with as many as four series wins in a row, the 1922 Yankees. Both of those teams made it to the World Series, although they lost. During this time, the Yankees tied an April record of 12 straight error-less games, from April 7 to 22. On April 22 against the Oakland Athletics the Yankees turned a triple play for the first time since June 3, 1968.

May

On May 8, Mark Teixeira hit 3 home runs against the Red Sox, becoming only the second Yankee player in history since Lou Gehrig to accomplish the feat.

June
On June 11, Andy Pettitte won his 200th game as a Yankee, becoming the third player to achieve the feat. The other two players are Yankee pitching legends Red Ruffing (231) and Whitey Ford (236). During the last 2 games against the Astros, Jorge Posada hit grand slams in back-to-back games becoming the third Yankee player to do so. The other two players are Baseball Hall of Fame members and Yankee legends Babe Ruth and Bill Dickey.

July

Brett Gardner became the first player in MLB history to hit a grand slam and an inside-the-park home run during back-to-back games on July 3–4.

The Yankees suffered three great losses during the month of July, two of which happened during the All-Star weekend.  First, on July 11, longtime Yankee Stadium public address announcer Bob Sheppard died at age 99.  Then just two days later on July 13, longtime owner George Steinbrenner died at age 80. Steinbrenner was the longest tenured owner in Yankees history and among active ownership. On July 21, former Yankee manager and executive Ralph Houk died.

On July 18, the Yankees were 58–33, their best 91-game record since the 1998 season, when they were 68–23, en route to a then American League record 114 wins, and a World Series victory over the Padres in 4 games.

Against the Royals on July 22, Derek Jeter hit only the second inside-the-park home run of his career, in a 10–4 Yankee win – his first came in his rookie year. The next day, Jorge Posada drove in his 1,000th career RBI against the Royals, becoming only the 12th Yankee to join the 1,000 RBI club and became one of three Yankees catchers to reach that mark, along with Yogi Berra (1,430) and Bill Dickey (1,209). Posada also became just the 5th catcher in MLB history with 1,000 RBI, 350 doubles and 250 home runs. The other four are Carlton Fisk, Iván Rodríguez, Johnny Bench and Gary Carter.

On July 25, Robinson Canó recorded his 1,000th career hit, becoming the third-quickest homegrown Yankees player – behind Derek Jeter and Don Mattingly – to reach that plateau.

August
On August 4, Alex Rodriguez hit his 600th career home run against the Toronto Blue Jays, becoming the youngest player in history to do so.

On August 8, Derek Jeter passed Babe Ruth on the all-time hits list when he knocked in a second-inning single collecting his 2,874th hit. He is the first Yankee to hold the Major League lead in hits among active players since Johnny Mize in 1952, according to the Elias Sports Bureau. During the same game against the Red Sox, Alex Rodriguez recorded his 300th career stolen base,  making Rodriguez the 10th player in baseball history with at least 1,500 runs scored, 2,500 hits, 200 home runs and 300 stolen bases. Rodriguez joined a select group in that category -- Jeter, Damon, Bonds, Biggio, Alomar, Rickey Henderson, Molitor, Joe Morgan and Mays—but only A-Rod, Mays and Bonds have hit as many as 600 homers to go along with the 300 steals.

Against the Kansas City Royals on August 14, Rodriguez hit 3 home runs in a game for the 4th time in his career.

On August 22, Sabathia recorded his 16th consecutive start of at least six innings allowing three earned runs or less, breaking a tie with Ron Guidry (from his Cy Young Award-winning 1978 season for the longest streak in franchise history).

September and October
On September 18, CC Sabathia notched his 20th win for the first time in his career.  He also became the first pitcher in 2010 to reach 20 wins.

On September 24, A-Rod notched career home runs #609 and #610, putting him in sole possession of 6th place on the all-time home run list. The blasts put him one home run ahead of MLB great Sammy Sosa. Also on this date, Mark Teixeira and A-Rod, who have been teammates for 3 years (2003 with Rangers, and 2009–10 with Yankees), hit two home runs in a game each for the first time.

On September 28, the Yankees clinched a playoff berth for the 15th time in the last 16 seasons. However, they lost the division crown to the Tampa Bay Rays on the last day of the season after an 8–4 loss to the Red Sox, thus they were the Wild Card. Losing 17 of their last 26 games, the Yankees failed to clinch the AL East after holding the lead on Labor Day for the first time since 1944.

Postseason

Division Series

The Yankees faced the Twins in the ALDS, and swept them in 3 games. This was the fourth time both teams have met in the postseason, with the Yankees winning all four matchups: a 3–1 Yankees win in 2003, a 3–1 Yankees win in 2004, and a Yankees sweep in 2009. However, this was the first time the Twins held home-field advantage, as the Yankees qualified for the Wild Card, while the Twins won the American League Central.

Game 1, October 6
8:30 p.m. (EDT) at Target Field in Minneapolis, Minnesota

Game 2, October 7
6:00 p.m. (EDT) at Target Field in Minneapolis, Minnesota

Game 3, October 9
8:30 p.m. (EDT) at Yankee Stadium in the Bronx, New York

American League Championship Series

The Yankees faced the Texas Rangers in the 2010 ALCS, which began Friday, October 15. The Rangers won the series in six games, eliminating the Yankees and preventing them from defending their title.

Game 1
Friday, October 15, 2010 – 8:00 p.m. (EDT) at Rangers Ballpark in Arlington in Arlington, Texas

Game 2
Saturday, October 16, 2010 – 4:00 p.m. (EDT) at Rangers Ballpark in Arlington in Arlington, Texas

Game 3
Monday, October 18, 2010 – 8:00 p.m. (EDT) at Yankee Stadium in the Bronx, New York

Game 4
Tuesday, October 19, 2010 – 8:00 p.m. (EDT) at Yankee Stadium in the Bronx, New York

Game 5
Wednesday, October 20, 2010 – 4:07 p.m. (EDT) at Yankee Stadium in the Bronx, New York

Game 6
Friday, October 22, 2010 – 8:07 p.m. (EDT) at Rangers Ballpark in Arlington in Arlington, Texas

Statistics

Game log

|- style="text-align:center; background:#fbb;"
|1||April 4||@ Red Sox||7–9||Okajima (1–0)||Park (0–1)||Papelbon (1)||37,440||0–1
|- style="text-align:center; background:#bfb;"
|2||April 6||@ Red Sox||6–4||Aceves (1–0)||Okajima (1–1)||Rivera (1)||38,000||1–1
|- style="text-align:center; background:#bfb;"
|3||April 7||@ Red Sox||3–1 (10)||Park (1–1)||Papelbon (0–1)||Rivera (2)||38,238||2–1
|- style="text-align:center; background:#fbb;"
|4||April 9||@ Rays||3–9||Price (1–0)||Vázquez (0–1)||||33,221||2–2
|- style="text-align:center; background:#bfb;"
|5||April 10||@ Rays||10–0||Sabathia (1–0)||Davis (0–1)||||29,892||3–2
|- style="text-align:center; background:#bfb;"
|6||April 11||@ Rays||7–3||Burnett (1–0)||Choate (0–1)||||31,253||4–2
|- style="text-align:center; background:#bfb;"
|7||April 13||Angels||7–5||Pettitte (1–0)||Santana (0–2)||Rivera (3)||49,293||5–2
|- style="text-align:center; background:#fbb;"
|8||April 14||Angels||3–5||Piñeiro (1–1)||Vázquez (0–2)||Rodney (1)||42,372||5–3
|- style="text-align:center; background:#bfb;"
|9||April 15||Angels||6–2||Hughes (1–0)||Kazmir (0–1)||Rivera (4)||44,722||6–3
|- style="text-align:center; background:#bfb;"
|10||April 16||Rangers||5–1 (6)||Sabathia (2–0)||Wilson (0–1)||||42,145||7–3
|- style="text-align:center; background:#bfb;"
|11||April 17||Rangers||7–3||Burnett (2–0)||Feldman (1–1)||||44,963||8–3
|- style="text-align:center; background:#bfb;"
|12||April 18||Rangers||5–2||Pettitte (2–0)||Harden (0–1)||Rivera (5)||44,121||9–3
|- style="text-align:center; background:#bfb;"
|13||April 20||@ Athletics||7–3||Vázquez (1–2)||Gonzalez (1–1)||||19,849||10–3
|- style="text-align:center; background:#bfb;"
|14||April 21||@ Athletics||3–1||Hughes (2–0)||Sheets (1–1)||Rivera (6)||30,211||11–3
|- style="text-align:center; background:#fbb;"
|15||April 22||@ Athletics||2–4||Braden (3–0)||Sabathia (2–1)||Bailey (2)||21,986||11–4
|- style="text-align:center; background:#fbb;"
|16||April 23||@ Angels||4–6||Rodney (2–0)||Chamberlain (0–1)||Fuentes (2)||44,002||11–5
|- style="text-align:center; background:#bfb;"
|17||April 24||@ Angels||7–1||Pettitte (3–0)||Piñeiro (2–2)||||43,390||12–5
|- style="text-align:center; background:#fbb;"
|18||April 25||@ Angels||4–8||Kazmir (2–1)||Vázquez (1–3)||||42,284||12–6
|- style="text-align:center; background:#fbb;"
|19||April 27||@ Orioles||4–5||Castillo (1–0)||Robertson (0–1)||Simón (1)||20,536||12–7
|- style="text-align:center; background:#bfb;"
|20||April 28||@ Orioles||8–3||Sabathia (3–1)||Guthrie (0–3)||||17,248||13–7
|- style="text-align:center; background:#bfb;"
|21||April 29||@ Orioles||4–0||Burnett (3–0)||Matusz (2–1)||||26,439||14–7
|- style="text-align:center; background:#bfb;"
|22||April 30||White Sox||6–4||Aceves (2–0)||Thornton (2–2)||Rivera (7)||44,783||15–7
|-

|- style="text-align:center; background:#fbb;"
|23||May 1||White Sox||6–7||Linebrink (1–0)||Robertson (0–2)||Jenks (5)||45,265||15–8
|- style="text-align:center; background:#bfb;"
|24||May 2||White Sox||12–3||Hughes (3–0)||Buehrle (2–4)||||45,303||16–8
|- style="text-align:center; background:#bfb;"
|25||May 3||Orioles||4–1||Sabathia (4–1)||Guthrie (0–4)||Chamberlain (1)||41,571||17–8
|- style="text-align:center; background:#bfb;"
|26||May 4||Orioles||4–1||Burnett (4–0)||Matusz (2–2)||Chamberlain (2)||43,260||18–8
|- style="text-align:center; background:#bfb;"
|27||May 5||Orioles||7–5||Pettitte (4–0)||Hernandez (0–4)||Aceves (1)||43,425||19–8
|- style="text-align:center; background:#bfb;"
|28||May 7||@ Red Sox||10–3||Hughes (4–0)||Beckett (1–1)||||37,898||20–8
|- style="text-align:center; background:#bfb;"
|29||May 8||@ Red Sox||14–3||Aceves (3–0)||Buchholz (3–3)||||37,138||21–8
|- style="text-align:center; background:#fbb;"
|30||May 9||@ Red Sox||3–9||Lester (3–2)||Burnett (4–1)||||37,618||21–9
|- style="text-align:center; background:#fbb;"
|31||May 10||@ Tigers||4–5||Bonine (3–0)||Mitre (0–1)||Valverde (9)||34,365||21–10
|- style="text-align:center; background:#bbb;"
|||May 11||@ Tigers||colspan=6|Postponed (rain). Rescheduled for May 12
|- style="text-align:center; background:#fbb;"
|32||May 12||@ Tigers||0–2||Porcello (3–3)||Vázquez (1–4)||Valverde (10)||27,376||21–11
|- style="text-align:center; background:#bfb;"
|33||May 12||@ Tigers||8–0||Hughes (5–0)||Bonderman (1–2)||||28,514||22–11
|- style="text-align:center; background:#fbb;"
|34||May 13||@ Tigers||0–6||Verlander (4–2)||Sabathia (4–2)||||31,130||22–12
|- style="text-align:center; background:#bfb;"
|35||May 14||Twins||8–4||Chamberlain (1–1)||Baker (4–3)||||45,195||23–12
|- style="text-align:center; background:#bfb;"
|36||May 15||Twins||7–1||Pettitte (5–0)||Liriano (4–2)||||46,347||24–12
|- style="text-align:center; background:#fbb;"
|37||May 16||Twins||3–6||Blackburn (4–1)||Chamberlain (1–2)||Rauch (10)||46,628||24–13
|- style="text-align:center; background:#bfb;"
|38||May 17||Red Sox||11–9||Vázquez (2–4)||Papelbon (1–3)||||48,271||25–13
|- style="text-align:center; background:#fbb;"
|39||May 18||Red Sox||6–7||Bard (1–1)||Rivera (0–1)||Papelbon (10)||47,734||25–14
|- style="text-align:center; background:#fbb;"
|40||May 19||Rays||6–10||Davis (4–3)||Burnett (4–2)||Benoit (1)||43,283||25–15
|- style="text-align:center; background:#fbb;"
|41||May 20||Rays||6–8||Shields (5–1)||Pettitte (5–1)||Soriano (11)||45,483||25–16
|- style="text-align:center; background:#bfb;"
|42||May 21||@ Mets||2–1||Vázquez (3–4)||Dessens (0–1)||Rivera (8)||41,382||26–16
|- style="text-align:center; background:#fbb;"
|43||May 22||@ Mets||3–5||Pelfrey (6–1)||Hughes (5–1)||Rodríguez (7)||41,343||26–17
|- style="text-align:center; background:#fbb;"
|44||May 23||@ Mets||4–6||Santana (4–2)||Sabathia (4–3)||Rodríguez (8)||41,422||26–18
|- style="text-align:center; background:#bbb;"
|||May 25||@ Twins||colspan=6|Suspended (rain). Completed on May 26
|- style="text-align:center; background:#bfb;"
|45||May 26||@ Twins||1–0||Burnett (5–2)||Duensing (2–1)||Rivera (9)||38,962||27–18
|- style="text-align:center; background:#bfb;"
|46||May 26||@ Twins||3–2||Pettitte (6–1)||Rauch (1–1)||Rivera (10)||39,353||28–18
|- style="text-align:center; background:#fbb;"
|47||May 27||@ Twins ||2–8||Blackburn (6–1)||Vázquez (3–5)||||39,087||28–19
|- style="text-align:center; background:#bfb;"
|48||May 28||Indians||8–2||Hughes (6–1)||Carmona (4–3)||||44,634||29–19
|- style="text-align:center; background:#fbb;"
|49||May 29||Indians||11–13||Perez (1–0)||Chamberlain (1–3)||Wood (2)||46,599||29–20
|- style="text-align:center; background:#bfb;"
|50||May 30||Indians||7–3||Burnett (6–2)||Sipp (0–1)||||45,706||30–20
|- style="text-align:center; background:#bfb;"
|51||May 31||Indians||11–2||Pettitte (7–1)||Talbot (6–4)||||44,976||31–20
|-

|- style="text-align:center; background:#bfb;"
|52||June 1||Orioles||3–1||Vázquez (4–5)||Matusz (2–6)||Rivera (11)||43,059||32–20
|- style="text-align:center; background:#bfb;"
|53||June 2||Orioles||9–1||Hughes (7–1)||Bergesen (3–4)||||44,465||33–20
|- style="text-align:center; background:#bfb;"
|54||June 3||Orioles||6–3||Sabathia (5–3)||Millwood (0–6)||Rivera (12)||44,927||34–20
|- style="text-align:center; background:#fbb;"
|55||June 4||@ Blue Jays||1–6||Cecil (6–2)||Burnett (6–3)||||30,089||34–21
|- style="text-align:center; background:#fbb;"
|56||June 5||@ Blue Jays||2–3 (14)||Janssen (4–0)||Gaudin (0–3)||||37,165||34–22
|- style="text-align:center; background:#bfb;"
|57||June 6||@ Blue Jays||4–3||Vázquez (5–5)||Downs (1–5)||Rivera (13)||33,622||35–22
|- style="text-align:center; background:#bfb;"
|58||June 8||@ Orioles||12–7||Hughes (8–1)||Millwood (0–7)||||23,171||36–22
|- style="text-align:center; background:#bfb;"
|59||June 9||@ Orioles||4–2||Sabathia (6–3)||Tillman (0–2)||Rivera (14)||16,451||37–22
|- style="text-align:center; background:#fbb;"
|60||June 10||@ Orioles||3–4||Arrieta (1–0)||Burnett (6–4)||Hernandez (1)||27,064||37–23
|- style="text-align:center; background:#bfb;"
|61||June 11||Astros||4–3||Pettitte (8–1)||Myers (4–4)||Rivera (15)||46,883||38–23
|- style="text-align:center; background:#bfb;"
|62||June 12||Astros||9–3||Vázquez (6–5)||Rodríguez (3–9)||||46,159||39–23
|- style="text-align:center; background:#bfb;"
|63||June 13||Astros||9–5||Hughes (9–1)||Moehler (0–3)||||46,832||40–23
|- style="text-align:center; background:#bfb;"
|64||June 15||Phillies||8–3||Sabathia (7–3)||Halladay (8–5)||||47,135||41–23
|- style="text-align:center; background:#fbb;"
|65||June 16||Phillies||3–6||Moyer (7–6)||Burnett (6–5)||||47,414||41–24
|- style="text-align:center; background:#fbb;"
|66||June 17||Phillies||1–7||Kendrick (4–2)||Pettitte (8–2)||||47,204||41–25
|- style="text-align:center; background:#fbb;"
|67||June 18||Mets||0–4||Takahashi (6–2)|| Vázquez (6–6)||Rodríguez (16)||49,220||41–26
|- style="text-align:center; background:#bfb;"
|68||June 19||Mets||5–3||Hughes (10–1)||Pelfrey (9–2)||Rivera (16)||49,073||42–26
|- style="text-align:center; background:#bfb;"
|69||June 20||Mets||4–0||Sabathia (8–3)||Santana (5–4)||||49,240||43–26
|- style="text-align:center; background:#fbb;"
|70||June 21||@ Diamondbacks||4–10||López (3–6)||Burnett (6–6)||||47,229||43–27
|- style="text-align:center; background:#bfb;"
|71||June 22||@ Diamondbacks||9–3||Pettitte (9–2)||Haren (7–6)||||45,776||44–27
|- style="text-align:center; background:#bfb;"
|72||June 23||@ Diamondbacks||6–5 (10)||Rivera (1–1)||Rosa (0–2)||||46,325||45–27
|- style="text-align:center; background:#bfb;"
|73||June 25||@ Dodgers||2–1||Sabathia (9–3)||Padilla (1–2)||Rivera (17)||56,000||46–27
|- style="text-align:center; background:#fbb;"
|74||June 26||@ Dodgers||4–9||Kuroda (7–5)||Burnett (6–7)||||56,000||46–28
|- style="text-align:center; background:#bfb;"
|75||June 27||@ Dodgers||8–6 (10)||Rivera (2–1)||Troncoso (1–2)||||56,000||47–28
|- style="text-align:center; background:#fbb;"
|76||June 29||Mariners||4–7||Lee (7–3)||Hughes (10–2)||||45,780||47–29
|- style="text-align:center; background:#fbb;"
|77||June 30||Mariners||0–7||Hernández (6–5)||Vázquez (6–7)||||46,309||47–30
|-

|- style="text-align:center; background:#bfb;"
|78||July 1||Mariners||4–2||Sabathia (10–3)||Aardsma (0–5)||Rivera (18)||45,591||48–30
|- style="text-align:center; background:#fbb;"
|79||July 2||Blue Jays||1–6 (11)||Frasor (3–1)||Robertson (0–3)||||45,792||48–31
|- style="text-align:center; background:#bfb;"
|80||July 3||Blue Jays||11–3||Pettitte (10–2)||Romero (6–5)||||46,364||49–31
|- style="text-align:center; background:#bfb;"
|81||July 4||Blue Jays||7–6 (10)||Robertson (1–3)||Purcey (0–1)||||46,810||50–31
|- style="text-align:center; background:#bfb;"
|82||July 5||@ Athletics||3–1||Vázquez (7–7)||Sheets (3–8)||Rivera (19)||27,405||51–31
|- style="text-align:center; background:#bfb;"
|83||July 6||@ Athletics||6–1||Sabathia (11–3)||Cahill (8–3)||||29,473||52–31
|- style="text-align:center; background:#bfb;"
|84||July 7||@ Athletics||6–2||Burnett (7–7)||Gonzalez (7–6)||||31,518||53–31
|- style="text-align:center; background:#bfb;"
|85||July 8||@ Mariners||3–1||Pettitte (11–2)||Aardsma (0–6)||Rivera (20)||37,432||54–31
|- style="text-align:center; background:#bfb;"
|86||July 9||@ Mariners||6–1||Hughes (11–2)||Pauly (0–1)||||39,645||55–31
|- style="text-align:center; background:#fbb;"
|87||July 10||@ Mariners||1–4||Hernández (7–5)||Chamberlain (1–4)||||42,558||55–32
|- style="text-align:center; background:#bfb;"
|88||July 11||@ Mariners||8–2||Sabathia (12–3)||Rowland-Smith (1–9)||||42,069||56–32
|- style="text-align:center;"
|colspan="9" style="background:#bbcaff;"|All-Star Break: NL defeats AL 3–1
|- style="text-align:center; background:#bfb;"
|89||July 16||Rays||5–4||Rivera (3–1)||Choate (2–3)||||47,524||57–32
|- style="text-align:center; background:#fbb;"
|90||July 17||Rays||5–10||Niemann (8–2)||Burnett (7–8)||||48,957||57–33
|- style="text-align:center; background:#bfb;"
|91||July 18||Rays||9–5||Park (2–1)||Price (12–5)||||46,969||58–33
|- style="text-align:center; background:#fbb;"
|92||July 20||Angels||2–10||O'Sullivan (1–0)||Hughes (11–3)||||47,775||58–34
|- style="text-align:center; background:#bfb;"
|93||July 21||Angels||10–6||Vázquez (8–7)||Piñeiro (10–7)||||47,521||59–34
|- style="text-align:center; background:#bfb;"
|94||July 22||Royals||10–4||Sabathia (13–3)||Chen (5–4)||||47,484||60–34
|- style="text-align:center; background:#bfb;"
|95||July 23||Royals||7–1||Burnett (8–8)||Bannister (7–9)||||46,801||61–34
|- style="text-align:center; background:#fbb;"
|96||July 24||Royals||4–7||Davies (5–6)||Mitre (0–2)||Soria (27)||48,138||61–35
|- style="text-align:center; background:#bfb;"
|97||July 25||Royals||12–6||Hughes (12–3)||O'Sullivan (1–1)||||47,890||62–35 
|- style="text-align:center; background:#bfb;"
|98||July 26||@ Indians||3–2||Vázquez (9–7)||Westbrook (6–7)||Rivera (21)||27,224||63–35
|- style="text-align:center; background:#fbb;"
|99||July 27||@ Indians||1–4||Tomlin 1–0||Sabathia (13–4)||C. Perez (10)||27,416||63–36
|- style="text-align:center; background:#bfb;"
|100||July 28||@ Indians||8–0||Burnett (9–8)||Carmona (10–8)||||22,965||64–36
|- style="text-align:center; background:#bfb;"
|101||July 29||@ Indians||11–4||Moseley (1–0)||Herrmann (0–1)||||34,455||65–36
|- style="text-align:center; background:#fbb;"
|102||July 30||@ Rays||2–3||Davis (9–9)|| Hughes (12–4)||Soriano (29)||36,973||65–37
|- style="text-align:center; background:#bfb;"
|103||July 31||@ Rays||5–4||Robertson (2–3)||Soriano (2–1)||Rivera (22)||36,973||66–37
|-

|- style="text-align:center; background:#fbb;"
|104||August 1||@ Rays||0–3||Shields (10–9)||Sabathia (13–5)||Soriano (30)||36,973||66–38
|- style="text-align:center; background:#fbb;"
|105||August 2||Blue Jays||6–8||Morrow (8–6)||Burnett (9–8)||Gregg (24) ||47,034||66–39
|- style="text-align:center; background:#fbb;"
|106||August 3||Blue Jays||2–8||Romero (9–7)||Moseley (1–1)||||46,480||66–40
|- style="text-align:center; background:#bfb;"
|107||August 4||Blue Jays||5–1||Hughes (13–4)||Marcum (10–5)||||47,659||67–40
|- style="text-align:center; background:#fbb;"
|108||August 6||Red Sox||3–6||Buchholz (12–5)||Vázquez (9–8)||Papelbon (27)||49,555||67–41
|- style="text-align:center; background:#bfb;"
|109||August 7||Red Sox||5–2||Sabathia (14–5)||Lackey (10–7)||Rivera (23)||49,716||68–41
|- style="text-align:center; background:#bfb;"
|110||August 8||Red Sox||7–2||Moseley (2–1)||Beckett (3–2)||||49,096||69–41
|- style="text-align:center; background:#fbb;"
|111||August 9||Red Sox||1–2||Lester (12–7)||Hughes (13–5) ||Papelbon (28)||49,476||69–42
|- style="text-align:center; background:#fbb;"
|112||August 10||@ Rangers||3–4 (10)||Feliz (3–2)||Rivera (3–2)||||46,121||69–43
|- style="text-align:center; background:#bfb;"
|113||August 11||@ Rangers||7–6||Wood (2–4)||Feliz (3–3)||Rivera (24)||48,676||70–43
|- style="text-align:center; background:#bfb;"
|114||August 12||@ Royals||4–3||Sabathia (15–5)||Chen (7–6)||Robertson (1)||23,337||71–43
|- style="text-align:center; background:#fbb;"
|115||August 13||@ Royals||3–4||Davies (6–7)||Moseley (2–2)||Soria (32)||30,680||71–44
|- style="text-align:center; background:#bfb;"
|116||August 14||@ Royals||8–3||Hughes (14–5)||O'Sullivan (1–4)||||34,206||72–44
|- style="text-align:center; background:#fbb;"
|117||August 15||@ Royals||0–1||Bullington (1–2)||Burnett (9–10)||Soria (33)||26,012||72–45
|- style="text-align:center; background:#fbb;"
|118||August 16||Tigers||1–3||Scherzer (8–9)||Vázquez (9–9)||Valverde (23)||46,098||72–46
|- style="text-align:center; background:#bfb;"
|119||August 17||Tigers||6–2||Sabathia (16–5)||Verlander (13–8)||||46,906||73–46
|- style="text-align:center; background:#bfb;"
|120||August 18||Tigers||9–5||Moseley (3–2)||Bonderman (6–9)||||46,479||74–46
|- style="text-align:center; background:#bfb;"
|121||August 19||Tigers||11–5||Hughes (15–5)||Porcello (5–11)||Mitre (1)||48,143||75–46
|- style="text-align:center; background:#fbb;"
|122||August 20||Mariners||0–6||Hernández (9–10)||Burnett (9–11)||||46,493||75–47
|- style="text-align:center; background:#bfb;"
|123||August 21||Mariners||9–5||Logan (1–0)||Vargas (9–6)||Rivera (25)||48,158||76–47
|- style="text-align:center; background:#bfb;"
|124||August 22||Mariners||10–0||Sabathia (17–5) ||French (2–4)||||46,778||77–47
|- style="text-align:center; background:#fbb;"
|125||August 23||@ Blue Jays||2–3||Downs (5–5)||Robertson (2–4)||Gregg (28)||29,198||77–48
|- style="text-align:center; background:#bfb;"
|126||August 24||@ Blue Jays||11–5||Moseley (4–2)||Rzepczynski (1–2)||||30,567||78–48
|-  style="text-align:center; background:#fbb;"
|127||August 25||@ Blue Jays||2–6||Cecil (11–6)||Hughes (15–6) ||Gregg (29)||31,449||78–49
|-  style="text-align:center; background:#fbb;"
|128||August 27||@ White Sox||4–9||García (11–5)||Burnett (9–12)||||38,596||78–50
|-  style="text-align:center; background:#bfb;"
|129||August 28||@ White Sox||12–9||Sabathia (18–5)||Danks (12–9)||Rivera (26)||38,811||79–50
|-  style="text-align:center; background:#bfb;"
|130||August 29||@ White Sox||2–1||Nova (1–0)||Floyd (9–11)||Rivera (27)||39,433||80–50
|-  style="text-align:center; background:#bfb;"
|131||August 30||Athletics||11–5||Vázquez (10–9)||Cahill (14–6)||||46,356||81–50
|-  style="text-align:center; background:#bfb;"
|132||August 31||Athletics||9–3||Hughes (16–6)||Mazzaro (6–7)||||44,575||82–50
|-

|-  style="text-align:center; background:#bfb;"
|133||September 1||Athletics||4–3||Burnett (10–12)||Anderson (3–6)||Rivera (28)||45,222||83–50
|-  style="text-align:center; background:#bfb;"
|134||September 2||Athletics||5–0||Sabathia (19–5)||Braden (9–10)|| ||44,644||84–50
|-  style="text-align:center; background:#bfb;"
|135||September 3||Blue Jays||7–3||Wood (3–4)||Morrow (10–7)|| ||44,739||85–50
|-  style="text-align:center; background:#bfb;"
|136||September 4||Blue Jays||7–5||Chamberlain (2–4)||Frasor (3–4)||Rivera (29)||47,478||86–50
|-  style="text-align:center; background:#fbb;"
|137||September 5||Blue Jays||3–7||Cecil (12–7)||Hughes (16–7)|| ||47,737||86–51
|-  style="text-align:center; background:#fbb;"
|138||September 6||Orioles||3–4||Matusz (8–12)||Burnett (10–13)||Uehara (7)||46,103||86–52
|-  style="text-align:center; background:#fbb;"
|139||September 7||Orioles||2–6||Arrieta (5–6)||Sabathia (19–6)|| ||46,432||86–53
|-  style="text-align:center; background:#bfb;"
|140||September 8||Orioles||3–2||Chamberlain (3–4)||Uehara (1–1)|| ||44,163||87–53
|-  style="text-align:center; background:#fbb;"
|141||September 10||@ Rangers||5–6 (13)||Feldman (7–10)||Gaudin (0–4)|| ||46,179||87–54
|-  style="text-align:center; background:#fbb;"
|142||September 11||@ Rangers||6–7||Ogando (4–1)||Rivera (3–3)|| ||49,210||87–55
|-  style="text-align:center; background:#fbb;"
|143||September 12||@ Rangers||1–4||Lee (11–8)||Moseley (4–3)||Feliz (36)||42,007||87–56
|-  style="text-align:center; background:#fbb;"
|144||September 13||@ Rays||0–1 (11)||Balfour (2–1)||Mitre (0–3)||||26,907||87–57
|-  style="text-align:center; background:#bfb;"
|145||September 14||@ Rays||8–7 (10)||Robertson (3–4)||Wheeler (2–3)||Rivera (30)||28,713||88–57
|-  style="text-align:center; background:#fbb;"
|146||September 15||@ Rays||3–4||Qualls (2–4)||Hughes (16–8)||Soriano (43)||29,733||88–58
|-  style="text-align:center; background:#bfb;"
|147||September 17||@ Orioles||4–3||Robertson (4–4)||Uehara (1–2)||Rivera (31)||32,874||89–58
|-  style="text-align:center; background:#bfb;"
|148||September 18||@ Orioles||11–3||Sabathia (20–6)||Guthrie (10–14)||||48,775||90–58
|-  style="text-align:center; background:#fbb;"
|149||September 19||@ Orioles||3–4 (11)||Gonzalez (1–3)||Robertson (4–5)||||39,537||90–59
|-  style="text-align:center; background:#bfb;"
|150||September 20||Rays||8–6||Gaudin (1–4)||Garza (14–9)||Rivera (32)||47,437||91–59
|-  style="text-align:center; background:#bfb;"
|151||September 21||Rays||8–3||Hughes (17–8)||Shields (13–13)||Chamberlain (3)||46,609||92–59
|-  style="text-align:center; background:#fbb;"
|152||September 22||Rays||2–7||Hellickson (4–0)||Burnett (10–14)||||46,986||92–60
|-  style="text-align:center; background:#fbb;"
|153||September 23||Rays||3–10||Price (18–6)||Sabathia (20–7)||||47,646||92–61
|-  style="text-align:center; background:#fbb;"
|154||September 24||Red Sox||8–10||Beckett (6–5)||Pettitte (11–3)||Papelbon (37)||49,457||92–62
|-  style="text-align:center; background:#fbb;"
|155||September 25||Red Sox||3–7||Lester (19–8)||Nova (1–1)||||49,558||92–63
|-  style="text-align:center; background:#bfb;"
|156||September 26||Red Sox||4–3 (10)||Logan (2–0)||Okajima (4–4)||||49,199||93–63
|-  style="text-align:center; background:#fbb;"
|157||September 27||@ Blue Jays||5–7||Rzepczynski (3–4)||Burnett (10–15)||Gregg (36)||16,004||93–64
|-  style="text-align:center; background:#bfb;"
|158||September 28||@ Blue Jays||6–1||Sabathia (21–6)||Drabek (0–2)|| ||16,208||94–64
|-  style="text-align:center; background:#fbb;"
|159||September 29||@ Blue Jays||4–8||Cecil (15–7)||Vázquez (10–10)||||33,143||94–65
|-

|-  style="text-align:center; background:#bbb;"
|—||October 1||@ Red Sox|| colspan=6 |Postponed due to rain
|-  style="text-align:center; background:#bfb;"
|160||October 2||@ Red Sox||6–5 (10)||Hughes (18–8)||Papelbon (5–7)||Rivera (33)||37,467||95–65
|-  style="text-align:center; background:#fbb;"
|161||October 2||@ Red Sox||6–7 (10)||Manuel (1–0)||Nova (1–2)||||37,589||95–66
|-  style="text-align:center; background:#fbb;"
|162||October 3||@ Red Sox||4–8||Lackey (14–11)||Moseley (4–4)||||37,453||95–67
|-

Postseason Game log

|-  style="text-align:center; background:#bfb;"
|1||October 6||@ Twins||6–4||Sabathia (1–0)||Crain (0–1)||Rivera (1)||42,032||1–0
|-  style="text-align:center; background:#bfb;"
|2||October 7||@ Twins||5–2||Pettitte (1–0)||Pavano (0–1)||Rivera (2)||42,035||2–0
|-  style="text-align:center; background:#bfb;"
|3||October 9|| Twins||6–1||Hughes (1–0)||Duensing (0–1)||||50,840||3–0
|-

|-  style="text-align:center; background:#bfb;"
|1||October 15|| @ Rangers||6–5||Moseley (1–0)||O'Day (0–1)||Rivera (1)||50,930||1–0
|-  style="text-align:center; background:#fbbbbb;"
|2||October 16|| @ Rangers||2–7||Lewis (1–0)||Hughes (0–1)||||50,362||1–1
|-  style="text-align:center; background:#fbbbbb;"
|3||October 18|| Rangers||0–8||Lee (1–0)||Pettitte (0–1)||||49,480||1–2
|-  style="text-align:center; background:#fbbbbb;"
|4||October 19|| Rangers||3–10||Holland (1–0)||Burnett (0–1)||Oliver (1)||49,977||1–3
|-  style="text-align:center; background:#bfb;"
|5||October 20|| Rangers||7–2||Sabathia (1–0)||Wilson (0–1)||||49,832||2–3
|-  style="text-align:center; background:#fbbbbb;"
|6||October 22|| @ Rangers||1–6||Lewis (2–0)||Hughes (0–2)||||51,404||2–4
|-

Player stats

Batting
Note: G = Games played; AB = At bats; H = Hits; 2B = Doubles; 3B = Triples; HR = Home runs; RBI = Runs batted in; SB = Stolen bases; BB = Walks; AVG = Batting average; SLG = Slugging percentage

Source:

Pitching
Note: W = Wins; L = Losses; ERA = Earned run average; G = Games pitched; GS = Games started; SV = Saves; IP = Innings pitched; H = Hits allowed; R = Runs allowed; ER = Earned runs allowed; BB = Walks allowed; SO = Strikeouts

Source:

Farm system

LEAGUE CHAMPIONS: Tampa

References

External links
2010 New York Yankees season Official Site
2010 New York Yankees season at ESPN
2010 New York Yankees season at Baseball Reference

New York Yankees seasons
New York Yankees
New York Yankees
2010s in the Bronx